Suhl – Schmalkalden-Meiningen IV is an electoral constituency (German: Wahlkreis) represented in the Landtag of Thuringia. It elects one member via first-past-the-post voting. Under the current constituency numbering system, it is designated as constituency 21. It covers the urban district of Suhl and a small part of Schmalkalden-Meiningen.

Suhl – Schmalkalden-Meiningen IV was created for the 1994 state election, replacing the constituency of Suhl, which covered only the city of Suhl. Originally named Suhl – Schmalkalden-Meiningen III, it was given its current name in 2014. Since 2019, it has been represented by Philipp Weltzien of The Left.

Geography
As of the 2019 state election, Suhl – Schmalkalden-Meiningen IV covers the urban district of Suhl (excluding Gehlberg and Schmiedefeld am Rennsteig) and a small part of Schmalkalden-Meiningen, specifically the municipalities of Oberhof and Zella-Mehlis (excluding Benshausen).

Members
The constituency was held by the Christian Democratic Union (CDU) from its creation in 1994 until 2004. Its first representative was Werner Ulbrich, who served from 1994 to 1999, followed by Wolfgang Wehner (1999–2004). It was won by the Party of Democratic Socialism in 2004, and represented by Ina Leukefeld. She was re-elected as a candidate for The Left in 2009 and 2014. Since 2019, the constituency has been represented by Philipp Weltzien of The Left.

Election results

2019 election

2014 election

2009 election

2004 election

1999 election

1994 election

References

Electoral districts in Thuringia
1994 establishments in Germany
Schmalkalden-Meiningen
Suhl
Constituencies established in 1994